Enrico Bartoletti (7 October 1916 – 5 March 1976) was an Italian Roman Catholic archbishop who served on the Italian Episcopal Conference and also as the Archbishop of Lucca. Bartoletti was renowned for his personal holiness and for his political tact which he delivered while serving on the Italian Episcopal Conference. Bartoletti also worked to defend the lives of the Jewish people during World War II and contributed to DELASEM.

His process for beatification commenced on 11 November 2007 in the Archdiocese of Lucca and was granted the title Servant of God - the first stage in the process - on 4 September 2007 when formal approval to the introduction of the cause was given.

Life
Enrico Bartoletti was born on 7 October 1916 in Florence.

Bartoletti commenced his studies for the priesthood in Florence in 1937 and was later sent to Rome for his theological studies at the Almo Collegio Capranica there in 1934. It was there that he met Giulio Belvederi and the rector - and future cardinal - Augustin Bea. He also attended the Gregorian University for additional studies. Upon his return to Florence he received his ordination to the priesthood from Elia Dalla Costa in 1939; his return was short lived for he returned to Rome for further studies at the Pontifical Biblical Institute in sacred scripture.

Bartoletti was made the rector of the Minor Seminary in 1943 and served as a teacher of the Greek and Hebrew languages in addition to serving as a teacher of sacred scripture. During World War II he made his support of the Jewish people known and was quite vocal of the injustices against them during the Holocaust that Nazi Germany was perpetrating; due to this he collaborated with DELASEM and was even arrested on 8 December 1943 though released with strong threats and warnings. In 1955 he was made the rector of the Major Seminary.

Upon his return home he was made the director of the Minor Seminary. Pope Pius XII appointed him as the Auxiliary Bishop of Lucca which meant that Bartoletti would need to be made a bishop; he received his episcopal consecration on 8 September 1958 from Ermenegildo Florit. In Lucca he was seen as a strong leader of moral principle with the knack for being a careful mediator. With Pope John XXIII introducing the Second Vatican Council, Bartoletti was known for his remarkable contribution to catechetical and liturgical reform.

In 1966 he was appointed as the see's Apostolic Administrator until the elevation of a new archbishop and then - in 1971 - was appointed as the Coajutor Archbishop of Lucca with the "right of succession" upon the death or resignation of the current head. Bartoletti became the Archbishop of Lucca in 1973 and was installed not long after. Pope Paul VI appointed him as the Secretary General of the Italian Bishop's Conference in 1972; he possessed great political tact in realizing and addressing the potential consequences of a referendum on divorce. He resigned as Archbishop of Lucca on 31 March 1973 and lived a quiet life after submitting his resignation.

Bartoletti died in the morning of 5 March 1976 of a heart attack in the Gemelli Hospital in Rome; he was buried 6 March 1976 in the Cathedral of San Martino.

Beatification process
The official announcement that Lucca would petition for Bartoletti's cause of sanctification came on 8 December 1998 following a diocesan event.

The transfer of the competent forum for the process was transferred from Rome to Lucca on 28 June 2007. The title Servant of God was bestowed upon Bartoletti on 4 September 2007 after the Congregation for the Causes of Saints - under Pope Benedict XVI - granted their approval to the beginning of the process. The diocesan process opened on 11 November 2007. The process concluded at a closing Mass held on 9 October 2016.

The first postulator from the beginning of the cause was the Capuchin Carlo Calloni while the current postulator is fellow Capuchin friar Florio Tessari. The vice-postulator is Emilio Citti.

References

External links
Hagiography Circle
Catholic Hierarchy

1916 births
1976 deaths
20th-century venerated Christians
20th-century Italian people
20th-century Italian Roman Catholic archbishops
Almo Collegio Capranica alumni
Clergy from Florence
Italian Servants of God
Pontifical Biblical Institute alumni
Pontifical Gregorian University alumni
Italian resistance movement members